Naman Keïta (born 9 April 1978 in Paris, France) is a track and field athlete, who takes part in the 400 m hurdles and 4 x 400m relay, competing internationally for France. He won the 4x400m relay gold medal at the 2003 World Championships in Paris, France. He was the bronze medalist in the 400 metres hurdles at the 2004 Olympic Games in Athens, Greece. Besides, he won a gold medal and a bronze medal in the 4x400 m relay at the European Athletics Championships.

Personal
Keïta was born in Paris to a Malian father and an Algerian mother. His hobbies are cooking and jazz music.

Career
Naman Keïta started running while in primary school. He worked for six months as a postman, before stopping to focus his energies on the World Championships and Olympic Games. He is able to use a 12 stride pattern between the hurdles. He competed internationally for Mali until the end of 1999, when he switched his allegiance to France.

He finished fourth in the 400 m hurdles final at the 2006 European Athletics Championships.

Keïta tested positive for a prohibited substance (testosterone) while taking part in the 2007 World Athletics Championship in Osaka, Japan. He was suspended from all competitions for two years by the Fédération française d'athlétisme in October 2007, with the suspension taking effect from 1 Sep 2007.

See also
List of sportspeople sanctioned for doping offences

References

External links

1978 births
Living people
French male hurdlers
French male sprinters
Athletes (track and field) at the 2004 Summer Olympics
Olympic athletes of France
Olympic bronze medalists for France
French people of Malian descent
French sportspeople of Algerian descent
Athletes from Paris
Doping cases in athletics
French sportspeople in doping cases
World Athletics Championships medalists
European Athletics Championships medalists
Medalists at the 2004 Summer Olympics
Olympic bronze medalists in athletics (track and field)
World Athletics Championships winners
20th-century French people
21st-century French people